The Kou-Kamma Local Municipality council consists of twelve members elected by mixed-member proportional representation. Six councillors are elected by first-past-the-post voting in six wards, while the remaining six are chosen from party lists so that the total number of party representatives is proportional to the number of votes received.

Results 
The following table shows the composition of the council after past elections.

December 2000 election

March 2006 election

May 2011 election

August 2016 election

By-elections from August 2016 to November 2021
The following by-elections were held to fill vacant ward seats in the period between the elections in August 2016 and November 2021.

November 2021 election

References

Municipal elections in South Africa
Elections in the Eastern Cape
Sarah Baartman District Municipality